Peroxisomal membrane protein PEX14 is a protein that in humans is encoded by the PEX14 gene.

Function 

This gene encodes an essential component of the peroxisomal import machinery. The protein is integrated into peroxisome membranes with its C-terminus exposed to the cytosol, and interacts with the cytosolic receptor for proteins containing a PTS1 peroxisomal targeting signal. The protein also functions as a transcriptional corepressor and interacts with a histone deacetylase. A mutation in this gene results in one form of Zellweger syndrome.

Interactions 

PEX14 has been shown to interact with
 PEX5,
 PEX7, and
 PEX13.

References

Further reading

External links 
  GeneReviews/NCBI/NIH/UW entry on Peroxisome Biogenesis Disorders, Zellweger Syndrome Spectrum
 OMIM entries on Peroxisome Biogenesis Disorders, Zellweger Syndrome Spectrum